The 13th Huading Awards ceremony was held on August 27, 2014 in Shanghai.

Nominations and winners
Complete list of nominees and winners (denoted in bold)

References

2014 television awards
2014 in Chinese television
Huading Awards